Nacliodes is a genus of moths in the family Erebidae. It contains the single species Nacliodes microsippia, which is found in Angola, Cameroon, the Democratic Republic of Congo, Equatorial Guinea and Uganda.

References

Natural History Museum Lepidoptera generic names catalog

Syntomini
Monotypic moth genera
Moths described in 1912